The 1918 Camp Greenleaf football team represented Camp Greenleaf of Fort Oglethorpe during the 1918 college football season. Jock Sutherland was on the team. The team challenged Georgia Tech to a game, but Tech declined.

Andrew W. Smith was the coach until he was selected in November 1918 to serve overseas.

Schedule

References

Camp Greenleaf
College football undefeated seasons
Camp Greenleaf football